Ndanai is a settlement in Kenya's Rift Valley Province.

References 

Ndanai Is within Sotik constituency, Bomet county

Populated places in Rift Valley Province